Eschweilera baguensis is a species of tree in the family Lecythidaceae. It is found in Ecuador and Peru and is considered a vulnerable species by the IUCN.

References

baguensis
Vulnerable plants
Trees of Peru
Trees of Ecuador
Taxonomy articles created by Polbot